
Shoshana Grossbard (born October 23, 1948; also known as Shoshana Grossbard-Shechtman, Amyra Grossbard-Shechtman, and Amyra
Grossbard) is an economist and professor of economics emerita at San Diego State University. She is also a member of the Family Inequality Network, HCEO, University of Chicago and a research fellow at the Institute for the Study of Labor and the CESifo Institute. She is a well-published scholar as well as a founder of two organizations related to household economics: a journal, the Review of Economics of the Household founded in 2001 (she remains its editor in chief) and the Society of Economics of the Household. The Society (SEHO) holds annual meetings since 2017.

The main focus of Grossbard's research is household economics, family economics and economics of marriage. A student of Gary Becker and James Heckman at the University of Chicago and of Jacob Mincer, she was one of the first economists to enter this research area. In her theoretical approach she views marriages and cohabitating couples as firms, with spouses possibly hiring each other's work in household production, which she calls "Work-In-Household (WiHo)". To the extent that husbands employ their wives' WiHo and pay them a low "quasi-wage" women can be considered as being exploited by their husbands, as claimed by Marxist-feminist economists. As are workers and firms in standard models of labor markets in her models spouses are interacting in a non-cooperative way.

Legal ownership of the household is a question related to the analysis of marriages as firms. Robert Ellickson has argued that owners of the household's capital should have more influence on decision-making related to the household than those who work in the household's production. In contrast, Grossbard has proposed that those doing the household's production should have more control over decisions than owners of the household's capital.

Grossbard is one of the first social scientists to have analyzed consequences of gender imbalance in sex ratio for intra-household distribution, labor supply, fertility and cohabitation. She has shown that variation in sex ratio over time is inversely related to married women's labor supply in the U.S.

Selected publications
 Grossbard, S. (2015). The Marriage Motive: A Price Theory of Marriage. How Marriage Markets Affect Employment, Consumption and Savings. Springer. 
 
 Grossbard-Shechtman, Shoshana (1999). "Marriage" in Encyclopedia of Political Economy, edited by Phillip O'Hara. London: Routledge
 
 Grossbard-Shechtman, A. (1984). "A theory of allocation of time in markets for labour and marriage", Economic Journal, 94:863-882.

See also

 Parental dividend

References

External links
 Shoshana Grossbard's webpage
 

Economists from California
1948 births
Living people
American women economists
San Diego State University faculty
University of Chicago alumni
21st-century American economists
21st-century American women